Brassel Mountain at , is the 261-st highest peak in Ireland, on the Arderin scale. It is part of the MacGillycuddy's Reeks range in County Kerry.  Brassel Mountain is the south-east spur of the larger neighbouring peaks, Cnoc an Chuillinn , and Cnoc an Chuillinn East Top .  Because of its positioning away from the main ridge of the Reeks, and away from the glens used to access the Reeks (e.g. the Hag's Glen), Brassel is less frequently climbed, but can be used as an exit, or entry point to the main ridge.

Notes

References

See also 
 Lists of mountains in Ireland
 List of mountains of the British Isles by height
 List of Furth mountains in the British Isles

External links
MountainViews: The Irish Mountain Website
MountainViews: Irish Online Mountain Database
The Database of British and Irish Hills , the largest database of British Isles mountains ("DoBIH")
Hill Bagging UK & Ireland, the searchable interface for the DoBIH
Ordnance Survey Ireland ("OSI") Online Map Viewer
Logainm: Placenames Database of Ireland

Mountains and hills of County Kerry